Menna El-Tanany (born 19 September 1990) is an Egyptian badminton player. She was part of the national team that won the mixed team title in 2017 African Championships.

Achievements

African Championships 
Women's singles

Mixed doubles

BWF International Challenge/Series (8 titles, 6 runners-up) 
Women's singles

Women's doubles

Mixed doubles

  BWF International Challenge tournament
  BWF International Series tournament
  BWF Future Series tournament

References

External links 
 

Living people
1990 births
Sportspeople from Cairo
Egyptian female badminton players
Competitors at the 2015 African Games
African Games competitors for Egypt
21st-century Egyptian women